Chrysoclista villella is a species of moth of the family Agonoxenidae. It is found in the United States (Washington) and Canada (British Columbia).

The wingspan is about 10 mm for both males and females. The forewing ground colour is bright orange, anteriorly broadly margined with shining blackish brown which extends nearly to fold from base to one-half wing length, and posteriorly similarly margined, nearly meeting anterior dark margin distally. There is a wing pattern of three round tubercular, blackish-brown edged, silver metallic spots. The hindwings are greyish brown with purplish reflection.

References

Moths described in 1904
Agonoxeninae
Moths of North America